Nawab Naarkali is a 1972 Indian Tamil-language comedy film, directed by C. V. Rajendran and produced by K. Balakrishnan. The film stars Jaishankar and Nagesh, with Lakshmi, Rama Prabha and V. K. Ramasamy, S. V. Sahasranamam and V. S. Raghavan playing supporting roles. It is based on the play of the same name, written by Komal Swaminathan. The film was released on 3 March 1972.

Plot 
Appaasaami, an appalam merchant and his wife Bhaakyam, are a childless couple. Ravi, a law college student, who is also a football player, works part-time, distributing newspapers to houses and as a tutor for managing his educational and accommodation expenses. Thaandavam has a large family, including his wife, son Subbu and nine other children. Kaanchana, whose manager is Naesamani Ponnaiyaa, lives with her father Raajavaelu, a man with mental disorientation and is looked after by Nurse Christy. Raajavaelu came to this state because he lost  given by Naesamani Ponnaiyaa in Kolkata Palace Hotel. One time, Subbu requests his father Thaandavam to give  to watch an English film but he refuses. So Subbu steals a seemingly old chair from their house, which unbeknownst to him, but known to his father and mother, is a magical Nawab's chair) and sells it at an auction shop for 25. Hearing this Appaasami brings the chair to his house. Meanwhile, Thaandavam, on hearing that the chair was sold to auction shop and later to Appaasami, sends his son, Subbu, out of the house. Thaandavam makes a plan to steal the chair from Appaasami's house. So he portrays himself as a Saadhu and forgetting that he chased Subbu out of his house, tells Appaasami that in order to bear a child, Appaasami must have a family with 10 kids to live in their house as tenants. Ravi, at this time, comes to meet Thaandavam for accommodation. Thaandavam requests Ravi to act as his son and they all enter Appaasami's house. Believing that Ravi has stolen that 2 lakh from her father, Kaanchana joins Thaandavam as his sister's daughter and enters Appaasami's house, though she later realises that Ravi did not steal that money. Her suspicion then falls on Appaasami and Subbu, but on inquiry it is found that they are also innocent. One day, Ravi sees three people trying to steal the Nawab's chair with the help someone signalling with a handkerchief from within the house. He decides to play a drama and tears off the chair seat, from which Raajavelu's stolen money flies from where it was stashed. Thaandavam claims it to be his money, but on inquiry, he says that money was given by Raajavelu. Unconvinced, Thaandavam is taken to Raajavelu's house. On hearing the news that money has been found but can no longer be retrieved, Raajavelu, who has been acting as a mad man, truly becomes mad. Ravi then decides to give the money to the government as it is black money. After Thaandavam's ploy is revealed, Appaasami decides to throw Thaandavam and his family out, but on hearing that his wife is pregnant, he changes his mind and requests everyone to stay with him.

Cast 
Jaishankar as Ravi
Lakshmi as Kaanchana (Raajavelu's daughter)
Rama Prabha as Nurse Christy
Nagesh as Subbu (Thaandavam's son)
V. S. Raghavan as Raajavelu
S. V. Sahasranamam as Thaandavam
Gandhimathi as Thaandavam's wife
V. K. Ramasamy as Appaasami
 A. R. Srinivasan as Naesamani Ponnaiyaa
S. N. Parvathy as Bhaakyam (Appasamy's wife)
Samikkannu as Rent collector
A. K. Veerasami as Auctioneer

Soundtrack 
The music was composed by M. S. Viswanathan and the lyrics were written by Kannadasan. The song "Chappathi Chappathi Thaan" attained popularity.

References

Bibliography

External links 
 

1970s Tamil-language films
1972 comedy films
1972 films
Films directed by C. V. Rajendran
Films scored by M. S. Viswanathan
Indian black-and-white films
Indian comedy films
Indian films based on plays